Behçet Kemal Çağlar (1908 – 24 October 1969) was a Turkish poet, educator and nationalist politician.

Biography 

Çağlar graduated as a senior mining engineer in 1929. He served as a regional manager at MTA (Turkish Mining Survey and Research Department), and for a short while, was a Member of Parliament.

In 1949 Çağlar published the magazine Şadırvan. He also directed the radio program "Şiir Dünyamız" (meaning Our World of Poetry in Turkish). Common themes in his poetry included Kemalism and populism.
Behcet Kemal Caglar taught Turkish Literature at Robert College (Robert College is an American College founded in 1862 in Istanbul, Turkey)

See also 
 Turkish poetry

References

Turkish poets
Turkish nationalists
1908 births
1969 deaths
People from Erzincan
20th-century poets
Republican People's Party (Turkey) politicians